The 1987 Portuguese legislative election took place on 19 July. The election renewed all 250 members of the Assembly of the Republic.

In the previous election, in 1985, the Social Democratic Party had won a minority government managing to survive in coalition with the Democratic and Social Center and the Democratic Renewal Party, and after the approval of a no-confidence motion from the left-wing parties, with the aid of the Democratic Renewal Party, the government fell. The PS tried to form a new government with the support of the PRD and CDU, but Mário Soares, the President at the time, rejected the idea and called for a new election.

The PSD was reelected in a landslide, winning a majority government with just over 50% of the votes and 148 of the 250 seats, a majority of 22. Not only was this the most seats that a Portuguese party had ever won in a free election, but it was first time since the Carnation Revolution that a single party won an absolute majority. Although the PSD was very popular going into the election, the size of its victory far exceeded the party's most optimistic expectations. The PSD won every district with the exception of Setúbal, Évora and Beja, which voted for the CDU.

The Socialist Party gained a few seats and got a slightly higher share of the vote, 22% compared with the almost 21% in 1985, but the scale of the PSD victory made the party lose most of its influence. Like in 1979, 1980 and 1985, the PS failed to win a single district. The left-wing Democratic Unity Coalition lost some of its MPs to the Socialist Party and the Democratic Renovator Party, now led by former President António Ramalho Eanes, lost almost all of its influence, mainly due to its responsibility in the fall of the former PSD minority government. The right-wing Democratic and Social Center lost almost half of its vote share, due to the effect of tactical voting for the also right-wing, Social Democratic Party.

European elections were held on the same day.

Background

Fall of the government

In the first months of 1987, a trip of a Portuguese parliamentary delegation to the Soviet Union, which also passed by Estonia, a territory that wasn't recognized by Portugal as under Soviet control, created a diplomatic issue that was used by the Opposition to bring down the Cavaco Silva minority government. Parliament approved, by a 134 to 108 vote, a motion of no confidence and the government falls. President Mário Soares refused an alternative PS-PRD-PCP government and decided to dissolve Parliament and call a snap election.

Leadership changes

CDS 1986 leadership election
The 1985 general election results were quite disappointing for CDS, and then party leader Francisco Lucas Pires resigned from the leadership. Adriano Moreira, supported by the more conservative wings, and João Morais Leitão, supported by the more "centrist" wings of the party, were the two candidates running for the leadership in the April 1986 congress. Adriano Moreira was elected new party leader by a 82 vote difference. The results are the following:

|- style="background-color:#E9E9E9"
! align="center" colspan=2 style="width:  60px"|Candidate
! align="center" style="width:  50px"|Votes
! align="center" style="width:  50px"|%
|-
|bgcolor=|
| align=left | Adriano Moreira
| align=right | 533
| align=right | 54.2
|-
|bgcolor=|
| align=left | João Morais Leitão
| align=right | 451
| align=right | 45.8
|-
|- style="background-color:#E9E9E9"
| colspan=2 style="text-align:left;" |   Turnout
| align=right |984
| align=center | 
|-
| colspan="4" align=left|Source: Results
|}

PS 1986 leadership election
In the 1985 general election the PS nominated António Almeida Santos, while an internal leadership, head by  António Macedo, ruled the party, but the Socialists achieved their worst result ever, just 20.8%. The PS candidate for the Presidency of the Republic, Mário Soares, was narrowly elected to that post by a 51% to 49% margin against Diogo Freitas do Amaral, the candidate supported by CDS and PSD. After that victory, the party called a party congress, for late June 1986, to elect a new leader. There were two candidates on the ballot, Vítor Constâncio and Jaime Gama. Vítor Constâncio was elected as new party leader.

|- style="background-color:#E9E9E9"
! align="center" colspan=2 style="width:  60px"|Candidate
! align="center" style="width:  50px"|Votes
! align="center" style="width:  50px"|%
|-
|bgcolor=|
| align=left | Vítor Constâncio
| align=center | WIN
| align=right | 
|-
|bgcolor=|
| align=left | Jaime Gama
| align=right | 
| align=right | 
|-
|- style="background-color:#E9E9E9"
| colspan=2 style="text-align:left;" |   Turnout
| align=right |
| align=center | 
|-
| colspan="4" align=left|Source: 
|}

PRD 1986 leadership election
The Democratic Renewal Party surprised with their excellent results in the 1985 elections, winning almost 18% of the votes. António Ramalho Eanes, the main figure and inspiration for PRD, left the post of President of the Republic in March 1986, and, shortly after in late April, was unanimously elected as the new leader of the PRD, succeeding Hermínio Martinho.

|- style="background-color:#E9E9E9"
! align="center" colspan=2 style="width:  60px"|Candidate
! align="center" style="width:  50px"|Votes
! align="center" style="width:  50px"|%
|-
|bgcolor=|
| align=left | António Ramalho Eanes
| colspan="2" align=right | Voice vote
|-
|- style="background-color:#E9E9E9"
| colspan=2 style="text-align:left;" |   Turnout
| align=right |
| align=right | 100.0
|-
| colspan="4" align=left|Source: 
|}

Electoral system 

The Assembly of the Republic has 250 members elected to four-year terms. Governments do not require absolute majority support of the Assembly to hold office, as even if the number of opposers of government is larger than that of the supporters, the number of opposers still needs to be equal or greater than 126 (absolute majority) for both the Government's Programme to be rejected or for a motion of no confidence to be approved.

The number of seats assigned to each district depends on the district magnitude. The use of the d'Hondt method makes for a higher effective threshold than certain other allocation methods such as the Hare quota or Sainte-Laguë method, which are more generous to small parties.

For these elections, and compared with the 1985 elections, the MPs distributed by districts were the following:

Parties
The table below lists the parties represented in the Assembly of the Republic during the 4th legislature (1985–1987) and that also partook in the election:

Campaign period

Party slogans

Candidates' debates
No debates between the main parties were held as the PSD leader and Prime Minister, Aníbal Cavaco Silva, refused to take part in any debate.

Opinion polling
  
The following table shows the opinion polls of voting intention of the Portuguese voters before the election. Those parties that are listed were represented in parliament (1985-1987). Included is also the result of the Portuguese general elections in 1985 and 1987 for reference.

National summary of votes and seats

|-
| colspan=11| 
|-  
! rowspan="2" colspan=2 style="background-color:#E9E9E9" align=left|Parties
! rowspan="2" style="background-color:#E9E9E9" align=right|Votes
! rowspan="2" style="background-color:#E9E9E9" align=right|%
! rowspan="2" style="background-color:#E9E9E9" align=right|±
! colspan="5" style="background-color:#E9E9E9" align="center"|MPs
! rowspan="2" style="background-color:#E9E9E9;text-align:right;" |MPs %/votes %
|- style="background-color:#E9E9E9"
! style="background-color:#E9E9E9;text-align=center|1985
! style="background-color:#E9E9E9;text-align=center|1987
! style="background-color:#E9E9E9" align=right|±
! style="background-color:#E9E9E9" align=right|%
! style="background-color:#E9E9E9" align=right|±
|-
| 
|2,850,784||50.22||20.3||88||148||60||59.20||24.0||1.18
|-
| 
|1,262,506||22.24||1.4||57||60||3||24.00||1.2||1.08
|-
| 
|689,137||12.14||3.4||38||31||7||12.40||2.8||1.02
|-
| 
|278,561||4.91||13.0||45||7||38||2.80||15.2||0.57
|-
| 
|251,987||4.44||5.6||22||4||18||1.60||7.2||0.36
|-
|style="width: 10px" bgcolor= align="center" | 
|align=left|People's Democratic Union
|50,717||0.89||0.4||0||0||0||0.00||0.0||0.0
|-
| 
|32,977||0.58||0.0||0||0||0||0.00||0.0||0.0
|-
| 
|32,607||0.57||||||0||||0.00||||0.0
|-
| 
|31,667||0.56||0.1||0||0||0||0.00||0.0||0.0
|-
| 
|23,218||0.41||||||0||||0.00||||0.0
|-
| 
|20,800||0.37||0.1||0||0||0||0.00||0.0||0.0
|-
| 
|18,544||0.33||0.1||0||0||0||0.00||0.0||0.0
|-
| 
|9,185||0.16||0.6||0||0||0||0.00||0.0||0.0
|-
|colspan=2 align=left style="background-color:#E9E9E9"|Total valid 
|width="65" align="right" style="background-color:#E9E9E9"|5,552,690
|width="40" align="right" style="background-color:#E9E9E9"|97.82
|width="40" align="right" style="background-color:#E9E9E9"|0.3
|width="40" align="right" style="background-color:#E9E9E9"|250
|width="40" align="right" style="background-color:#E9E9E9"|250
|width="40" align="right" style="background-color:#E9E9E9"|0
|width="40" align="right" style="background-color:#E9E9E9"|100.00
|width="40" align="right" style="background-color:#E9E9E9"|0.0
|width="40" align="right" style="background-color:#E9E9E9"|—
|-
|colspan=2|Blank ballots
|50,135||0.88||0.1||colspan=6 rowspan=4|
|-
|colspan=2|Invalid ballots
|73,533||1.30||0.4
|-
|colspan=2 align=left style="background-color:#E9E9E9"|Total
|width="65" align="right" style="background-color:#E9E9E9"|5,676,358
|width="40" align="right" style="background-color:#E9E9E9"|100.00
|width="40" align="right" style="background-color:#E9E9E9"|
|-
|colspan=2|Registered voters/turnout
||7,930,668||71.57||2.6
|-
| colspan=11 align=left | Source: Comissão Nacional de Eleições
|}

Distribution by constituency

|- class="unsortable"
!rowspan=2|Constituency!!%!!S!!%!!S!!%!!S!!%!!S!!%!!S
!rowspan=2|TotalS
|- class="unsortable" style="text-align:center;"
!colspan=2 | PSD
!colspan=2 | PS
!colspan=2 | CDU
!colspan=2 | PRD
!colspan=2 | CDS
|-
| style="text-align:left;" | Azores
| style="background:; color:white;"|66.7
| 4
| 20.0
| 1
| 2.3
| -
| 3.0
| -
| 3.3
| -
| 5
|-
| style="text-align:left;" | Aveiro
| style="background:; color:white;"|60.4
| 11
| 22.9
| 4
| 4.4
| -
| 2.7
| -
| 5.3
| -
| 15
|-
| style="text-align:left;" | Beja
| 24.5
| 1
| 20.3
| 1
| style="background:red; color:white;"|38.7
| 3
| 5.7
| -
| 2.0
| -
| 5
|-
| style="text-align:left;" | Braga
| style="background:; color:white;"|53.4
| 10
| 25.9
| 5
| 6.1
| 1
| 3.3
| -
| 5.9
| 1
| 17
|-
| style="text-align:left;" | Bragança
| style="background:; color:white;"|60.8
| 3
| 19.2
| 1
| 3.2
| -
| 1.3
| -
| 7.6
| -
| 4
|-
| style="text-align:left;" | Castelo Branco
| style="background:; color:white;"|52.1
| 4
| 22.4
| 2
| 7.1
| -
| 6.0
| -
| 4.7
| -
| 6
|-
| style="text-align:left;" | Coimbra
| style="background:; color:white;"|50.0
| 6
| 28.7
| 4
| 7.2
| 1
| 3.5
| -
| 4.5
| -
| 11
|-
| style="text-align:left;" | Évora
| 32.1
| 2
| 15.4
| -
| style="background:red; color:white;"|36.2
| 2
| 7.7
| -
| 2.1
| -
| 4
|-
| style="text-align:left;" | Faro
| style="background:; color:white;"|46.7
| 5
| 24.9
| 3
| 10.9
| 1
| 6.3
| -
| 3.1
| -
| 9
|-
| style="text-align:left;" | Guarda
| style="background:; color:white;"|60.0
| 4
| 21.8
| 1
| 3.3
| -
| 2.0
| -
| 6.6
| -
| 5
|-
| style="text-align:left;" | Leiria
| style="background:; color:white;"|60.8
| 9
| 18.7
| 2
| 5.9
| -
| 3.0
| -
| 6.0
| -
| 11
|-
| style="text-align:left;" | Lisbon
| style="background:; color:white;"|45.8
| 28
| 21.2
| 12
| 16.5
| 10
| 6.9
| 4
| 3.7
| 2
| 56
|-
| style="text-align:left;" | Madeira
| style="background:; color:white;"|65.5
| 4
| 16.2
| 1
| 1.9
| -
| 3.3
| -
| 5.2
| -
| 5
|-
| style="text-align:left;" | Portalegre
| style="background:; color:white;"|37.4
| 1
| 25.1
| 1
| 20.9
| 1
| 6.3
| -
| 3.1
| -
| 3
|-
| style="text-align:left;" | Porto
| style="background:; color:white;"|50.9
| 22
| 26.7
| 11
| 9.4
| 4
| 4.0
| 1
| 4.0
| 1
| 39
|-
| style="text-align:left;" | Santarém
| style="background:; color:white;"|47.9
| 7
| 21.7
| 3
| 12.6
| 1
| 7.3
| 1
| 3.6
| -
| 12
|-
| style="text-align:left;" | Setúbal
| 32.6
| 6
| 17.6
| 3
| style="background:red; color:white;"|32.7
| 7
| 8.7
| 1
| 1.9
| -
| 17
|-
| style="text-align:left;" | Viana do Castelo
| style="background:; color:white;"|54.5
| 5
| 20.3
| 1
| 6.3
| -
| 4.8
| -
| 7.7
| -
| 6
|-
| style="text-align:left;" | Vila Real
| style="background:; color:white;"|62.5
| 5
| 20.3
| 1
| 4.1
| -
| 1.4
| -
| 5.0
| -
| 6
|-
| style="text-align:left;" | Viseu
| style="background:; color:white;"|64.1
| 8
| 17.9
| 2
| 2.9
| -
| 1.7
| -
| 7.0
| -
| 10
|-
| style="text-align:left;" | Europe
| style="background:; color:white;"|37.0
| 1
| 28.4
| 1
| 15.9
| -
| 4.9
| -
| 6.6
| -
| 2
|-
| style="text-align:left;" | Outside Europe 
| style="background:; color:white;"|63.2
| 2
| 7.3
| -
| 1.4
| -
| 1.7
| -
| 19.9
| -
| 2
|-
|- class="unsortable" style="background:#E9E9E9"
| style="text-align:left;" | Total
| style="background:; color:white;"|50.2
| 148
| 22.2
| 60
| 12.1
| 31
| 4.9
| 7
| 4.4
| 4
| 250
|-
| colspan=12 style="text-align:left;" | Source: Comissão Nacional de Eleições
|}

Maps

Notes

References

Further reading
 David B. Goldey, "The Portuguese elections of 1987 and 1991 and the presidential election of 1991." Electoral Studies 11.2 (1992): 171–176.

External links 
Comissão Nacional de Eleições 
Centro de Estudos do Pensamento Político

See also

Politics of Portugal
List of political parties in Portugal
Elections in Portugal

Legislative elections in Portugal
1987 elections in Portugal
July 1987 events in Europe